Qeshlaq-e Akhmud-e Sofla (also Romanized as Qeshlāq-e Akhmūd-e Soflá) is a village in Qeshlaq Rural District, Abish Ahmad District, Kaleybar County, East Azerbaijan Province, Iran. At the 2006 census, its population was 38, in 7 families.

References 

Populated places in Kaleybar County